Per Vidar Kjølmoen (born 3 May 1973) is a Norwegian politician.

He was elected representative to the Storting from the constituency of Møre og Romsdal for the period 2021–2025, for the Labour Party.

References

1973 births
Living people
Labour Party (Norway) politicians
Møre og Romsdal politicians
Members of the Storting